Morgan John Tiller (October 13, 1918 – December 6, 1983) was an American football player and coach.  He played professionally for two seasons in the National Football League (NFL), with the Boston Yanks in 1944 and the Pittsburgh Steelers in 1945. Tiller appeared in a total of 14 career games.

References

External links
 

1918 births
1983 deaths
American football ends
Boston Yanks players
Denver Pioneers football players
Hampden–Sydney Tigers football coaches
Pittsburgh Steelers players
People from Trinidad, Colorado
Players of American football from Colorado
Wilmington Clippers players